Gordon Stephenson (6 June 1908 – 30 March 1997) was a British-born town planner and architect. He is best known for his role in shaping the modern growth and development of Perth, Western Australia.

Biography
Gordon Stephenson was born in 1908. He studied architecture at the University of Liverpool, graduating in 1930.

Early career 
His early career included working with Patrick Abercrombie on the Greater London Plan. Along with Peter Shepheard, he created an influential design for Stevenage, the first post-war British new town, which incorporated a pedestrianised town centre.

In 1953, he was commissioned by the state government of Western Australia to produce a plan for the metropolitan area of Perth and Fremantle. The resulting 1955 Plan for the Metropolitan Region was co-authored with Alistair Hepburn, and is commonly known as the "Stephenson-Hepburn Report". It included an atlas of maps which laid down a broad pattern of future land uses including highways and open space, and catered for significant additional population growth.

The report formed the basis for the 1963 Metropolitan Region Scheme for Perth and Fremantle, a legal instrument for regulating land-use and development in the urban area It remained the overarching strategic plan for the development of Perth until it was succeeded by the Corridor Plan for Perth in 1970.

Later career 

In 1953 he returned to the UK to take up the Chair of Civic Design at the University of Liverpool and, following his work in Perth, he was employed variously as a consultant planner and academic in New Zealand, Canada, and America. In Halifax, Canada, he is known for his 1957 plan to redevelop the entire downtown core as well as the forceful eviction of Africville, a historically black neighborhood. He subsequently returned to Perth and continued to play an important role in its development, amongst other things crafting plans for Joondalup and Midland regional centres, and for the campus of Murdoch University.

In later life, he authored several books. He died on 30 March 1997.

Personal life and collaboration with Flora Crockett 
In 1938, Stephenson married New Jersey-born Flora Bartlett Crockett (1914-1979). She had been one of the first two women to graduate in City Planning from MIT, in 1937. The two collaborated on published work and research thereafter. Gerald Dix writes of Crockett: "She was an immense support and a sound professional collaborator upon whose judgement her relied in much of his work for 40 years. It was a great blow to him when she died in 1979." The Stephensons had three daughters: Gail, Sarah and Ann.

Legacy 
Following his death in 1997, the Western Australian Minister for Planning acknowledged Stephenson's contributions to the development of the state, and his vision as providing the blueprint for the growth of the metropolitan region since 1963.

On 28 August 2011, the WA State Government announced that the recently completed building informally known as one40william would be renamed Gordon Stephenson House.

The Planning Department at the University of Liverpool is located in the Gordon Stephenson Building.

Works

Reports 
 Plan for the metropolitan region: Perth and Fremantle (1955)
The design of central Perth; some problems and possible solutions : a study made for the Perth Central Area Design Co-ordinating Committee (1975). 
Joondalup regional centre : a plan prepared for the government of Western Australia, the Wanneroo Shire Council and the MRPA (1977).
Midland Regional Centre: A plan prepared for the government of Western Australia, the Swan Shire Council and the MRPA (1977).
Plan for the shire of Swan: prepared for the Swan Shire Council  (1978).

Books

References 

1908 births
1997 deaths
People from Perth, Western Australia
Alumni of the University of Liverpool
Australian urban planners
British emigrants to Australia